PVP Cinema is an Indian film production company established by Prasad V Potluri.

Film production

Distribution

References

External links
 PVP Cinema on Facebook
 PVP Cinema on Twitter
 PVP Cinema on YouTube

Film production companies based in Hyderabad, India
Year of establishment missing